Mohd Apandi bin Mohamad is a Malaysian politician who has served as a Senator since September 2020. He is a member of PAS, a component party of the ruling Perikatan Nasional (PN) coalition at both federal and state levels.

Election results

References

Living people
1960 births
People from Kelantan
Malaysian Islamic Party politicians
Members of the Dewan Rakyat
Members of the Dewan Negara
21st-century Malaysian politicians